Baghdad Kultayuly Amreyev (born 1 March 1959) is a Kazakh political figure and diplomat. He served as the Secretary-General of the Organization of Turkic States between 2018 and 2022.

Early life and career 
He was born on 1 March 1959 in the village of Sholakkorgan, Turkistan Region, Soviet Union. In 1982, he graduated from the Tajik National University with a degree in Arab orientology. From 1985 to 1988, he was a teacher of the Arabic language and literature at the Kazakh State University. From 1991 to 1992, he was a senior lecturer at the Department of Arabic Philology, Kazakh State University. He has served as Advisor to the Prime Minister of Kazakhstan since 2014. During his service in the Middle East, he was also Coordinating Ambassador to African States and Permanent Representative to Islamic Educational, Scientific and Cultural Organization (ISESCO).

Diplomatic service 
In the 1980s. he served as a translator in Yemen, Syria and Iraq. In the early 90s, he was First Secretary - Deputy Head of the Department of the Middle East and Africa of the Ministry of Foreign Affairs of Kazakhstan. Beginning in 1996, he became ambassador to foreign states. In order, he served as ambassador to Saudi Arabia, Oman, Bahrain and Kuwait, the UAE, Egypt, Syria, Lebanon, Morocco, Jordan, Libya, Turkey, Albania, and Iran.

Secretary-General 
During his tenure, he has called for a united state overseeing the Turkic world.

In 2020, during the conflict starting in September, Amreyev declared his support to Azerbaijan against Armenia. On 12 May 2021, he condemned the Israeli role in the 2021 Israel–Palestine crisis, describing it as the "unproportioned use of force by Israeli security forces against innocent Palestinian civilians". He also called on the Israeli administration to take "the necessary measures for a peaceful resolution of the situation and an immediate cessation of attacks on civilians and armed infiltration of Muslim holy sites".

Personal life 
Aside from his native Kazakh, he speaks Russian, English, Turkish, Arabic, Persian and Tajik. He is married to Ardak Amreyeva and has three children.

Awards and titles 
 Order of Honor (2003)
 Medal "20 years of independence of the Republic of Kazakhstan" (2011)
 Ambassador Extraordinary and Plenipotentiary 1st Class

Foreign honours 
 : Dostlug Order in 2022.
 : Tourism adherent in 2022.

References 

Living people
1959 births
Ambassadors of Kazakhstan to Saudi Arabia
Ambassadors of Kazakhstan to Turkey
Ambassadors of Kazakhstan to Albania
Ambassadors of Kazakhstan to Iran
Kazakhstani orientalists
Secretaries-General of the Organization of Turkic States
Ambassadors of Kazakhstan to Egypt
Ambassadors of Kazakhstan to Oman
Ambassadors of Kazakhstan to Bahrain
Ambassadors of Kazakhstan to the United Arab Emirates
Ambassadors of Kazakhstan to Lebanon
Ambassadors of Kazakhstan to Kuwait
Ambassadors of Kazakhstan to Morocco
Ambassadors of Kazakhstan to Jordan